Penicillium vanderhammenii is a species of fungus in the genus Penicillium which was isolated from the Colombian Amazon forest.

References

vanderhammenii
Fungi described in 2011